Database (WCD) 2010 and International Religious Freedom Report for 2012'' of the U.S. Department of State. The article Religions by country has a sortable table from the Pew Forum report.

See also
 Religions by country

Notes

References
 Adherents.com World Religions Religion Statistics Geography Church Statistics
 BBC News's Muslims in Europe: Country guide
 CIA FactBook
 Religious Intelligence
 The University of Virginia
 The US State Department's International Religious Freedom Report 2007
 The US State Department's Background Notes
 Vipassana Foundation's Buddhists around the world 
 World Statesmen
 Catholic Hierarchy's Its Bishops and Dioceses, Current and Past

Religion-related lists by country
 
Religion-related lists